On 21 March 2020, at least 23 prisoners were killed and 83 injured during a riot which erupted in La Modelo prison in Bogotá, Colombia, amid fears over spreading of SARS-CoV-2 through prison walls during the COVID-19 pandemic. Prisoners across the country were protesting against overcrowding as well as poor health services ever since the outbreak of COVID-19.

See also 
 Tuluá prison riot

References 

2020 in Colombia
Prison uprisings
Events in Bogotá
March 2020 events in Colombia